Crisps Coaches is an Australian bus company operating services in South East Queensland and Northern New South Wales

Services
Crisps Coaches is a bus and coach operator, based in Warwick. As well as local school services it operates services from Warwick to  Brisbane, Toowoomba, Tenterfield and Moree.

In 1992, the Brisbane to Moree and Toowoomba to Tenterfield services were purchased from Skennars.

In the neighbouring town of Stanthorpe, Crisps Coaches & Bus Lines is operated by Russell Crisp's brother Dale.

Fleet
As at August 2014, the fleet consisted of 22 buses and coaches.

References

External links

Bus Australia gallery

Bus companies of Queensland
Bus transport in New South Wales